Croman Corporation is a helicopter operating company based in White City, Oregon, United States. These helicopters are used in Heli-logging, fire suppression, construction and many other activities. In addition the company operates an FAA Repair Station.

Heliport
Croman Heliport  is a private heliport located 1 mile east of White City in Jackson County, Oregon, USA.

Fleet
Croman operates a fleet of Sikorsky S-61, Bell 206BIII Jet Ranger, Lama 315B, and Hiller 12E Soloy helicopters.

See also
 List of companies based in Oregon

External links
Official company website

Helicopter operators
Companies based in Jackson County, Oregon
Transport companies established in 1976
White City, Oregon
Wildfire suppression
Logging
Privately held companies based in Oregon
1976 establishments in Oregon